Dharmendra Singh Yadav (born 29 December 1972) is a male Indian boxer From Sambhal district in Uttar Pradesh, who won a bronze medal in 1990 Asian Championship. He received Arjuna Award for boxing in 1991.

Yadav represented India 19 times in international events from 1989 to 1994. He won three silver and seven bronze medals. He won a bronze medal at the 1990 Commonwealth Games (light flyweight division). He turned professional in 1995, the first Indian boxer to do so.

Yadav competed in the flyweight division at the 1992 Summer Olympics. He was defeated in the first round by Hungary's István Kovács. He finished in 17th place. Yadav Is an ACP In Delhi Police. 

Yadav is India's first professional Boxer with an unbeaten record of 6 wins together. 

Yadav Won Silver Medal in SAF Games at Islamabad, Pakistan In 1989. 

Yadav Won Bronze Medal in Asian Championships at Beijing, China In 1989. 

Yadav Won Bronze Medal in Commonwealth Games at Auckland (New Zealand) In 1990. Won Bronze Medal in Padrosoto Alba International Boxing Championships at Cuba In 1990.  

Yadav Participated in Asian Games held at Beijing, China In 1990. 

Won Gold Medal in INDO USSR Boxing Championships at Hyderabad (A.P). 

Yadav Is First Indian Semi Finalist in Sixth World Cup at Mumbai (India) and was adjudged the Most Promising Boxer of Sixth World Cup and was awarded BATA POWER Trophy In 1990.

Yadav Won Bronze Medal in Asian Championship (Olympic Qualifying Championship) held at Bangkok, Thailand and qualified for Olympics (Barcelona 1992). 

Yadav Won Bronze medal at Padrosoto Alba and Giraldo-Cardova-Cardian in Cuba In 1992. 

Yadav Awarded "the most Promising Boxer" Award in Asia In 1992. 

Yadav Won Gold Medal in YMCA’s Invitational International Boxing Championship held at New Delhi and was declared as the Best Boxer of the Championship In 1993. 

Yadav Won Bronze Medal in SAF Games, Dhaka, Bangladesh In 1993. 

Yadav Won Silver Medal in Asian Invitational Championship at Beijing, China In 1993.

Yadav Participated in King’s Cup International Tournament at Bangkok, Thailand 1993.

Yadav Won Bronze medal at Padrosoto Alba and Giraldo-Cardova-Cardian in Cuba 1994.

Yadav Participated in VII World Cup held at Bangkok, Thailand 1994.

Professional Ranking

1995 to 1997

4th Rank  (British Rating)

7th Rank PAN Asian Rating

Professional boxing record

See also
Boxing at the 1992 Summer Olympics
Boxing at the 1990 Commonwealth Games

References

External links
 

1972 births
Indian male boxers
Olympic boxers of India
Flyweight boxers
Living people
Commonwealth Games bronze medallists for India
Boxers at the 1990 Commonwealth Games
Boxers at the 1992 Summer Olympics
Commonwealth Games medallists in boxing
Place of birth missing (living people)
Recipients of the Arjuna Award
Medallists at the 1990 Commonwealth Games